Dinnie Apartments is a building in Grand Forks, North Dakota that was listed on the National Register of Historic Places (NRHP) in 1994.  Dinnie Apartments is included in the Grand Forks Near Southside Historic District, which was listed on the NRHP in 2004.

History
It was the first block of "spacious and elegant" townhouses built in Grand Forks  at the turn-of-the-century. It was built in 1903 as four townhouses, in Classical Revival style.
The south side of the city at that time was being populated by "wealthy merchants" during the Second Dakota Boom.
 

It was built by the firm of  Dinnie Brothers. John Dinnie (1853–1910) and James Dinnie (1863–1938)  founded the contracting firm of Dinnie Brothers in the middle eighteen eighties. The firm was especially active in the rebuilding of Fargo after the destruction of much of the city by fire in 1894. They also both served as mayors of Grand Forks.

See also
Dinnie Block

References

Residential buildings on the National Register of Historic Places in North Dakota
Neoclassical architecture in North Dakota
Residential buildings completed in 1903
National Register of Historic Places in Grand Forks, North Dakota
Individually listed contributing properties to historic districts on the National Register in North Dakota
1903 establishments in North Dakota